Typha × bavarica is a plant of hybrid origin, endemic to southern Germany. It apparently originated as a cross between  the two very widespread species T. angustifolia and T. shuttleworthii.  Typha × bavarica grows in freshwater marshes.

References

bavarica
Freshwater plants
Plant nothospecies
Endemic flora of Germany
Plants described in 1900